Mathioya Constituency is an electoral constituency in Kenya. It is one of seven constituencies of Muranga County. The constituency has three wards comprising Kiru, Kamacharia and Gitugi wards all electing Members of the County Assembly to the Muranga County Assembly.

The Official Constituency website is https://mathioyaconstituency.go.ke/ that has a constituency bursary portal, tender portal and public notice board and provides other online services to the people of Mathioya.

Mathioya Constituency has five Locations: Aberdare Forest, Gitugi, Kamacharia, Kiru, Njumbi, and Rwathia. According to the Muranga District’s Statistics Office 2001, Mathioya’s population is 110,139, and is the second largest Constituency after Kiharu with 136.9 sq miles (220.8sq. km). Mathioya however is the most densely populated with 110,139 against the nearest Kahuro Constituency with 92,104.

It prides itself with the two great Mathioya Rivers  (Mathioya iyego & Mathioya  gatua ciūma) after which the constituency is named and which is one of the hardest rafting rivers in Kenya with over 137 ft of descent over its 13.7-mile length. It attracts tourists who risk kayaking through the swift meanders with occasional fly fishing of some rainbow trout. Mathioya Constituency has a steep hilly topography and a climate suitable mainly for tea production, although there are pockets of coffee plantations. The lower parts of Mathioya also grow the macadamia nuts which were introduced in the mid 80’s by the Kenya Nut Company, while the upper part, which is much cooler due to the proximity to the Aberdare Ranges  grows pears, plums, apples, tea and coffee.

The following Members of Parliament have represented the constituency.

Members of Parliament

Locations and wards

References 

Constituencies in Central Province (Kenya)
Constituencies in Murang'a County